The Purple V is a 1943 American war film directed by George Sherman and starring John Archer, Mary McLeod and Fritz Kortner. The Purple V marked German stage star Fritz Kortner's American film debut. Actors John Archer and Mary McLeod were borrowed from M-G-M for the production.

Plot
Royal Air Force flyer Jimmy Thorne (John Archer) and pilot Roger (Peter Lawford) are returning from a night photo reconnaissance flight over Germany, Jimmy  recognizes the area. He reveals he lived there 10 years earlier, when his father was American consul in the region.

Encountering a German cargo aircraft, they shoot it down, but Jimmy is forced to parachute from his damaged aircraft so that Roger can get the important photos back to England. Jimmy lands near the wreck of the German aircraft, finding a dead German aviator, and takes his uniform. He then helps another Luftwaffe officer, near death who entrusts him with a personal note from Field Marshall Irwin Rommel to Adolf Hitler. The officer sees a purple V tattoo on Jimmy's left arm and realizes he has given away the secrets of the North African campaign.

Jimmy heads to the nearby village of Diederfeld, where an old acquaintance, Professor Thomas Forster (Fritz Kortner), his daughter Katti (Mary McLeod), and son Paul (Rex Williams). The Forsters are wary of Jimmy and claim not to remember him. Finally Jimmy reminds Katti and Paul of childhood events. Paul is determined to help Jimmy.

At the wreck, the German officer is found alive and tells state police officer Johann Keller (Kurt Katch) about Jimmy's purple V tattoo, but dies before he can reveal Rommel's message. The Forsters soon hear a radio announcement about an RAF pilot in a German uniform with a purple V tattoo. Paul and Katti volunteer to take the message out of the country, but the professor says it is too dangerous.

Paul brands his left arm with a V, takes the German uniform but is caught by as German patrol and shot. Katti, the professor and Jimmy hear a radio announcement that the British spy is dead. Jimmy and Katti prepare to go to Zurich, posing as brother and sister. Keller suspects Paul was not the spy, and goes to the Forster home to force the professor and Katti to divulge Jimmy's whereabouts.

Jimmy kills Keller and he and Katti begin their trip. At a final border check, the professor dressed in Keller's uniform, "arrests" Jimmy and Katti and takes them to an airfield. When the professor's real identity is discovered, he holds off several soldiers before being killed, allowing Jimmy and Katti time to escape on a waiting aircraft.

When Jimmy and Katti land in England, Roger vouches for Jimmy which authenticates the important message. Jimmy and Katti decide to marry later.

Cast

 John Archer as Jimmy Thorne  
 Mary McLeod as Katti Forster  
 Fritz Kortner as Thomas Forster  
 Rex Williams as Paul Forster  
 Kurt Katch as Johann Keller  
 Walter Sande as Otto Horner  
 Wilhelm von Brincken as Col. von Ritter 
 Peter Lawford as Roger  
 Kurt Kreuger as Walter Heyse  
 Eva Hyde as Marta  
 Irene Seidner as Mrs. Vogel 
 Richard Aherne as British Radio Operator in Africa  
 Holger Bendixen as Bit Role  
 Arthur Blake as British General  
 Egon Brecher as Clerk  
 Frederic Brunn as Corporal  
 Michael Dyne as Young British Officer  
 Ludwig Hardt as Old Peasant 
 Herbert Heyes as American Colonel  
 Harry Holcombe as Nazi Pilot 
 David Lennox as Bit Role  
 Frank Reicher as Bit Role  
 Lester Sharpe as Nazi Hospital Physician  
 Pepi Sinoff as Old Peasant Woman  
 Walter Soderling as Voight  
 Sigfrid Tor as Morgenturm  
 Leslie Vincent as British Radio Operator

Production
The sets of The Purple V were designed by the art director Russell Kimball. All the action was filmed on sound stages with principal photography starting in early January 1943.

The aircraft in The Purple V were:
 Capelis XC-12
 Curtiss P-40 Warhawk

The Capelis XC-12 was purchased by RKO in March 1939, after which the studio's insurance company permanently grounded the aircraft. Used as a full-size prop, the transport appeared only in ground roles in RKO's feature films made during World War II. Flying sequences used a scale XC-12 miniature. The aircraft became a RKO back lot relic, falling into worse repair during the 1940s with the XC-12 miniature continued to be used in later feature films.

Reception
Hal Erickson reviewed The Purple V for allmovie.com. He said: "Though technically a Republic 'B', the 58-minute The Purple V has glossy production values commensurate with a top-of-the-bill A picture. German expatriate Fritz Kortner plays the largest role, as an anti-Nazi schoolmaster who helps a downed American flyer (John Archer) reached Allied lines with vital war information. As usual, the Nazis are incredibly stupid and lead-footed, enabling the flyer to accomplish his mission. Featured in the cast is Peter Lawford in one of his first major roles of the 1940s (contrary to popular belief, Lawford was not 'discovered' in this film, having made his American screen debut in 1938's Lord Jeff). The only drawback to the film is the lackluster performance by leading lady Mary McLeod."

Aviation film historian Stephen Pendo in Aviation in the Cinema (1985) dismissed The Purple V as "... another low-budget film."

References

Notes

Citations

Bibliography

 Farmer, James H. Celluloid Wings: The Impact of Movies on Aviation. Blue Ridge Summit, Pennsylvania: Tab Books Inc., 1984. . 
 Martin, Len D. The Republic Pictures Checklist: Features, Serials, Cartoons, Short Subjects and Training Films of Republic Pictures Corporation, 1935-1959. Jefferson, North Carolina: McFarland & Company Inc., 1998. .
 Pendo, Stephen. Aviation in the Cinema. Lanham, Maryland: Scarecrow Press, 1985. .

External links
 
 
 

1943 films
1940s war films
American war films
Films directed by George Sherman
Republic Pictures films
Films set in Germany
Films about Nazi Germany
World War II films made in wartime
American aviation films
American black-and-white films
1940s English-language films